APDD Pty Ltd is a construction company based in Melbourne, Victoria Australia. They provide a range of services including project design, construction management and construction. In particular it claims to specialise in the design and delivery of complex, high quality commercial and hospital/medical facilities.

Origin
APDD was originally the Melbourne branch of Austin Australia Pty Ltd, which was formed in 1961, was based in Sydney and which went into liquidation in 2004. In 2003, shortly prior to liquidation of Austin Australia, the Melbourne branch office became the basis of a new Austin affiliate company. The entire entity was sold in 2004 by the liquidators, Ernst & Young, to the branch manager, Steve Fraser, who became its managing director and has run the company since.

External links
 APDD official website.

References

Companies based in Melbourne
Construction and civil engineering companies established in 2003
Australian companies established in 2003